Eewai (English: The Ripple) is a 2022 non-feature Indian Meitei language film directed by Khwairakpam Bishwamittra. It is produced by Samir Thingbaijam under the banner of Nongdol Mamikol. The film stars Leishangthem Tonthoi in the lead role. It was premiered at Manipur State Film Development Society (MSFDS), Imphal on 26 June 2022. The film got official selections at the 4th Nepal Cultural International Film Festival 2022, Druk International Film Festival 2022 (Bhutan), Festivus Film Fest Canada 2022, Dadashaheb Phalke International Film Festival India 2023 and Gangtok International Film Festival 2022. It was screened at the 28th Kolkata International Film Festival in 'Short and Documentary Panorama section' on 19th and 21st December 2022 at Nandan-III and Sichir Mancha, Kolkata.
The film was certified by Central Board of Film Certification (CBFC) in 2022.

Synopsis
The film tells the agony of a mom whose little child dies premature. Within the Meitei group of Manipur, a baby who dies earlier than he attains the age of three years is taken into account a nasty omen to the household and all customary post-mortal ceremonies are deprived. However, for a mom, her child shall all the time be her little one without contemplating the age.

Cast
 Leishangthem Tonthoi as Henba's mother
 Henry as Henba's father
 Kshetrimayum Rashi as Henba's grandmother
 Suniti
 Khoibam Homeshwori
 Chandrakala
 Nandini
 Naobi
 Baby Kelvish Salam as Henba
 Gurumayum Ananta Sharma as Doctor
 Nganthoi

References

Meitei-language films
2022 films
Cinema of Manipur